Farrokh Khambata is an Indian entrepreneur, restaurateur, chef and caterer. He is the founder and CEO of "Catering & Allied", the company which owns and operates five restaurants in Mumbai. He also runs a catering business which specializes in celebrity catering.

Early life
Farrokh Khambata was born and raised in a Parsi family in Mumbai. His parents were accountants in the financial sector. He was educated at St. Mary's School, ICSE, Mumbai.

Khambata finished school at the age of 16 and pursued a career in science at K.C. College. After graduating from junior college he took up architecture, but soon dropped out and joined the Institute of Hotel Management, Catering Technology and Applied Nutrition, Mumbai to formalize his love for cooking.

Career
In September 2012, Farrokh opened a Far Eastern cuisine restaurant, Umame.

In July 2014, Farrokh launched his restaurant JOSS in Santacruz, Mumbai 

In 2016, Farrokh launched Jaan at the Penthouse at Sofitel, Dubai, which has since downed it's shutter.

In November 2018, he launched a Thai Robata fine dining restaurant named IZAYA, at the NCPA, Nariman Point, Mumbai. This same complex housed his other ventures - a lounge named Amadeus and a café aptly named Cafe At the NCPA.

As of December 2020, Joss, Izaya, Amadeus and Café at the NCPA have downed their shutters owing to the extensive lockdown in Mumbai City during the COVID-19 pandemic.

References

Further reading

External links

Living people
Indian chefs
Indian restaurateurs
Year of birth missing (living people)
Parsi people from Mumbai